Gamasb (also Romanized as Gāmāsb; also known as Fāmāst, Gāmāsp, and Pamas) is a village in Gamasiyab Rural District, in the Central District of Nahavand County, Hamadan Province, Iran. At the 2006 census, its population was 1,028, in 231 families.

Panoramic view

References

External links

Naqsh-i Jahan Square in Google Maps
Hamedan Province Cultural Heritage Website

Populated places in Nahavand County

ja:ニハーヴァンド